Carlos Alberto Guirland Báez (born 18 September 1961) is a retired association football midfielder from Paraguay. He played professional football in Paraguay, Chile and Argentina during his career.

Career
Born in Misiones Province, Guirland began playing football with Club Olimpia. He had spells playing in Argentina and Chile with Textil Mandiyú, Atlético Tucumán, Chacarita Juniors, Audax Italiano and Deportes La Serena. Guirland was a member of the La Serena squad which finished last in the 1999 Chilean Primera División and was relegated.

International 
Guirland made his international debut for the Paraguay national football team on 15 March 1989 in a friendly match against Martinique (0-2 win). He obtained a total number of ten international caps, scoring one goal for the national side.

References

External links
 
 Carlos Guirland at playmakerstats.com (English version of ceroacero.es)

1961 births
Living people
People from San Ignacio, Paraguay
Paraguayan footballers
Paraguayan expatriate footballers
Paraguay international footballers
Association football midfielders
Chacarita Juniors footballers
Deportivo Mandiyú footballers
Atlético Tucumán footballers
Club Sol de América footballers
Club Olimpia footballers
Audax Italiano footballers
Deportes La Serena footballers
Chilean Primera División players
Expatriate footballers in Argentina
Expatriate footballers in Chile
1989 Copa América players
1991 Copa América players